The following is a list of fictional people significant to the Three Kingdoms period (220–280) of China. The list includes characters in the 14th-century historical novel Romance of the Three Kingdoms by Luo Guanzhong and those found in other cultural references to the Three Kingdoms period.

In Romance of the Three Kingdoms

Chapter 1

 Zhuang Zi (莊子) [Nan Hua] (南華), old Taoist sage from Mount Hua that gave Zhang Jue the Way of Peace (太平要術).
 Cheng Yuanzhi (程遠志), a Yellow Turban leader killed by Guan Yu.
 Deng Mao (鄧茂), a Yellow Turban rebel leader killed by Zhang Fei.
 Gong Jing (龔景), the Inspector of Qing Province. He requested aid from Liu Yan when his province came under attack by the Yellow Turban rebels.
 Cheng Kuang (程曠), a eunuch and a member of the Ten Attendants.

Chapter 2

 Yan Zheng (嚴政), Zhang Bao's subordinate. He came under attack by Zhu Jun and Liu Bei. Knowing that defeat was inevitable, he killed Zhang Bao and surrendered.
 Gao Sheng (高昇), Zhang Bao's subordinate.
 Sun Zhong (孫仲), a Yellow Turban rebel leader who occupied Wancheng with Han Zhong and Zhao Hong. They were defeated by Zhu Jun and Liu Bei. Sun Zhong was killed by Liu Bei while attempting to escape.
 Liu Hui (劉恢), the Administrator of Daizhou. He offered help to Liu Bei.

Chapter 3
 Zhao Meng (趙萌), a Han dynasty general.
 Cui Yi (崔毅), Cui Lie's younger brother.

Chapter 5

 Bao Zhong (鮑忠), Bao Xin's younger brother. He was killed by Hua Xiong in a surprise attack near Sishui Pass. Bao Tao is his historical name.
 Yu She (俞涉), a general under Yuan Shu. He duelled with Hua Xiong outside Sishui Pass and was killed by the latter.
 Pan Feng (潘鳳), a general under Han Fu. He engaged Hua Xiong in a duel outside Sishui Pass and was killed by the latter. Pan Feng is the subject of a Chinese internet meme involving a line from the novel, "Here's one of my best men, Pan Feng. He can destroy Hua Xiong." This meme is a cultural phenomenon and has led to a surge in Pan Feng's popularity to rival the more well known figures of the Three Kingdoms period. This popularity has been attributed to various causes, such as desire to poke fun at traditions as a novelty, to feelings of helplessness and lack of individual recognition in Chinese society. It has spawned multiple fake biographies detailing the supposed exploits of Pan Feng that were supposedly too great to be mentioned officially.
 Mu Shun (穆順), a general under Zhang Yang. He was killed by Lü Bu in a duel outside Hulao Pass.
 Fang Yue (方悅), a general under Wang Kuang. He was killed by Lü Bu in a duel outside Hulao Pass.
 Wei Hong (衛弘), a rich man who sponsored Cao Cao when he raised an army to fight Dong Zhuo.
 Wu Anguo (武安國), a general under Kong Rong. He fought against Lü Bu outside Hulao Pass and retreated after Lü Bu severed his hand.
 Zhao Cen (趙岑), a military officer under Dong Zhuo.

Chapter 7
 Lady Wu (吳國太), the younger sister of Sun Jian's first wife. She also married Sun Jian and bore him Sun Lang and Sun Shangxiang.

Chapter 8
 Diaochan (貂蟬), Wang Yun's foster daughter. She caused Lü Bu and Dong Zhuo to turn against each other.

Chapter 11
 Zong Bao (宗寶), a general under Kong Rong.
 Huode Xingjun (火德星君; "Fire Star Lord"), a Taoist deity who decided not to burn Mi Zhu because of his great virtue.

Chapter 13
 Cui Yong (崔勇), a military officer under Guo Si. He was killed by Xu Huang.
 Li Xian (李暹), Li Jue's nephew. He was killed Xu Chu.

Chapter 14
 Xun Zheng (荀正), a subordinate of Yuan Shu's general Ji Ling. He was killed by Guan Yu.
 Fan Cheng (范成), the Administrator of Luoyang under Cao Cao.
 Li Bie (李別), Li Jue's nephew. He was killed by Xu Chu.

Chapter 15
 Chen Heng (陳橫), a vassal under the warlord Liu Yao. He defended Jianye with Xue Li and Zhang Ying when Sun Ce invaded the city. He was killed by Jiang Qin.

Chapter 16
 Lady Yan (嚴氏), Lü Bu's first wife. She bore him a daughter.
 Lady Cao (曹氏), Lü Bu's second wife and the daughter of Cao Bao.

Chapter 17
 Wang Hou (王垕), a supply officer under Cao Cao. He was executed by his lord to appease the soldiers' anger over food shortage.
 Zhang Xian (張先), Zhang Xiu's subordinate. He was killed by Xu Chu.
 Lei Xu (雷敘), Zhang Xiu's subordinate.

Chapter 19
 Liu An (劉安), a hunter.

Chapter 23
 Qin Qingtong (秦慶童), a servant of Dong Cheng who was caught having an affair with his master's concubine. He feared for his life so he betrayed Dong Cheng and informed Cao Cao about his master's assassination plot.
 Yunying (雲英), Dong Cheng's concubine. She had an affair with Qin Qingtong.

Chapter 27

 Du Yuan (杜遠), a former Yellow Turban rebel who became a bandit leader. He kidnapped Liu Bei's wives, whom Guan Yu was escorting, and brought them to his bandit stronghold. He was later killed by his fellow Liao Hua, who released the women and sent them back to Guan Yu. Liao Hua explained everything to Guan Yu and became his subordinate.
 Hu Hua (胡華), Hu Ban's father. He previously served as a Consultant (議郎) under Emperor Huan before retiring. He met Guan Yu and gave him a letter, telling him to pass it to his son Hu Ban, who was in Xingyang.
 Kong Xiu (孔秀), a military officer under Cao Cao. He was in charge of guarding Dongling Pass (south of present-day Dengfeng, Henan), and was killed by Guan Yu when he refused to allow the latter to pass through.
 Han Fu (韓福), the Administrator of Luoyang under Cao Cao. He ambushed Guan Yu outside Luoyang and injured Guan Yu's arm with an arrow but met his end at Guan Yu's hands.
 Meng Tan (孟坦), Han Fu's subordinate. He was killed by Guan Yu while attempting to kill him in an ambush outside Luoyang.
 Bian Xi (卞喜), a military officer under Cao Cao. He was tasked with guarding Sishui Pass (north of present-day Xingyang, Henan). He pretended to invite Guan Yu to attend a banquet in a temple, where he had secretly set up an ambush. Guan Yu discovered the ambush, killed Bian Xi, and passed through Sishui Pass safely.
 Pu Jing (浦靜), a monk from the same hometown as Guan Yu. He warned Guan Yu about Bian Xi's ambush.
 Wang Zhi (王植), the Administrator of Xingyang under Cao Cao. He pretended to welcome Guan Yu and let him stay in the guesthouse. That night, he ordered his men to surround the guesthouse and set fire to it, hoping to kill Guan Yu, but Guan Yu had already escaped after being tipped off by Hu Ban. Wang Zhi led his men in pursuit of Guan Yu and caught up with him, but ended up being killed by Guan Yu.
 Hu Ban (胡班), Hu Hua's son. He served as Wang Zhi's subordinate. He warned Guan Yu about Wang Zhi's plot and helped Guan Yu escape from Xingyang.
 Qin Qi (秦琪), a subordinate of Cao Cao's general Xiahou Dun. He was in charge of guarding a ferry point on the southern bank of the Yellow River. He was killed by Guan Yu in anger when he refused to allow him to cross the river.

Chapter 28

 Guan Ding (關定), Guan Ping's father.
 Guan Ning (關寧), Guan Ping's elder brother.
 Guo Chang (郭常), a man whose son stole the Red Hare from Guan Yu.
 Pei Yuanshao (裴元紹), a former Yellow Turban rebel who established a bandit stronghold together with Zhou Cang. When Guan Yu passed by their stronghold, the two men pledged allegiance to him and became his followers. Zhou Cang accompanied Guan Yu while Pei Yuanshao remained in the stronghold. Not long later, Pei Yuanshao was killed by Zhao Yun when he attempted to steal his horse.
 Zhou Cang (周倉)

Chapter 30
 Xin Ming (辛明), a military officer under Yuan Shao.

Chapter 32
 Wang Zhao (汪昭), a military officer under Yuan Tan. He was killed by Xu Huang.
 Cen Pi (岑璧), a general under Yuan Tan. He led the vanguard force when Yuan Tan attacked Yuan Shang, but was killed by Yuan Shang's general Lü Kuang in a duel.

Chapter 33
 Peng An (彭安), a general under Yuan Tan. He was killed by Xu Huang.
 Wuhuanchu (烏桓觸), the Administrator of You Province. He surrendered to Cao Cao during the Battle of White Wolf Mountain.

Chapter 34
 Zhang Wu (張武), a bandit leader in Jiangxia Commandery who caused much trouble for Liu Biao, the Governor of Jing Province. Liu Bei, who was Liu Biao's guest then, offered to help to deal with the bandits. Zhang Wu was killed by Zhao Yun.
 Chen Sun (陳孫), Zhang Wu's companion. He was killed by Zhang Fei.

Chapter 36
 Liu Mi (劉泌), Liu Feng's maternal uncle.

Chapter 40
 Li Gui (李珪), an adviser to Liu Biao. He was executed by Cai Mao.

Chapter 41

 Xiahou En (夏侯恩), a military officer under Cao Cao. He was the bearer of Cao Cao's Qinggang Sword (青釭劍). He was killed by Zhao Yun, who took the sword from him.
 Chunyu Dao (淳于導), Cao Ren's subordinate. He was killed by Zhao Yun.
 Yan Ming (晏明), Cao Hong's subordinate. He was killed by Zhao Yun.
 Zhong Jin (鐘縉), Xiahou Dun's subordinate. He was killed by Zhao Yun.
 Zhong Shen (鐘紳), Xiahou Dun's subordinate. He was killed by Zhao Yun.

Chapter 42

 Xiahou Jie (夏侯傑), a military officer under Cao Cao. He died of shock when Zhang Fei shouted at Cao Cao and his soldiers at Changban Bridge.

Chapter 45
 Cai Xun (蔡勳), Cai Mao's younger brother. He originally served Liu Biao but later served Cao Cao after Liu Cong surrendered to Cao Cao. He was killed by Gan Ning in a skirmish between the forces of Cao Cao and Sun Quan before the Battle of Red Cliffs.
 Cai He (蔡和), Cai Mao's younger cousin. He served Cao Cao after Liu Cong surrendered to Cao. He pretended to defect to Sun Quan's side while serving as a mole for Cao Cao. Zhou Yu knew that he was a spy and used him to spread false information in the enemy camp, leading to Cao Cao mistakenly believing that Huang Gai was planning to surrender to him. He was executed by Zhou Yu just before the Battle of Red Cliffs.
 Cai Zhong (蔡中), Cai He's elder brother. He was killed by Gan Ning during the Battle of Red Cliffs.

Chapter 48
 Lü Tong (呂通), a general under Cao Cao. In his English translation, Sinologist C. H. Brewitt-Taylor identified the character as Li Tong (李通), a historical general under Cao Cao.

Chapter 52

 Liu Xian (劉賢), the son of Liu Du, the Administrator of Lingling Commandery. He joined Xing Daorong in the attempt to ambush Liu Bei's forces but ended up getting captured by Zhang Fei. Liu Bei released him, and he was so grateful that he successfully persuaded his father to surrender to Liu Bei.
 Xing Daorong (邢道榮), a general serving under Liu Du. He wielded a huge battle axe called "Cleaver of Mountains". When Liu Bei invaded Lingling Commandery, Xing duelled with Liu Bei's generals Zhang Fei and Zhao Yun but was defeated and captured by them. He pretended to surrender to Liu Bei, hoping to lure Liu Bei's forces into a trap, but his plan failed and he was killed by Zhao Yun in the ensuing battle.
 Bao Long (鮑隆), Zhao Fan's subordinate.
 Chen Ying (陳應), Zhao Fan's subordinate. He was killed by Zhao Yun.

Chapter 53

 Gong Zhi (鞏志), an adviser to Jin Xuan, the Administrator of Wuling Commandery. He urged his lord to surrender when Zhang Fei attacked Wuling, but Jin Xuan ignored him. Gong Zhi then killed Jin Xuan and surrendered to Zhang Fei. Liu Bei appointed him as Administrator of Wuling Commandery to replace Jin Xuan.
 Yang Ling (楊齡), a general under Han Xuan. He was killed by Guan Yu.
 Jia Hua (賈華), a military officer under Sun Quan. His lord ordered him to set up an ambush to kill Liu Bei when the latter was meeting Lady Wu in Ganlu Temple. However, Liu Bei sensed the ambush and he pleaded with Lady Wu to spare him. Lady Wu was surprised because she was unaware of Sun Quan's plan to kill Liu Bei, and she shouted for all the assassins to come out of hiding. Lady Wu was furious and wanted to have Jia Hua executed but spared him when Sun Quan intervened.
 Ge Ding (戈定), a man from the same hometown as Taishi Ci. See Battle of Hefei (208)#In Romance of the Three Kingdoms.

Chapter 57
 Huang Kui (黃奎), an official who served as a Gentleman (侍郎) in the Han imperial court. He plotted against Cao Cao together with Ma Teng, but their plan was leaked out and Cao Cao had him and his family executed.
 Li Chunxiang (李春香), Huang Kui's concubine, executed by Cao Cao.
 Miao Ze (苗澤), Huang Kui's brother-in-law, executed by Cao Cao.

Chapter 58
 Zhong Jin (鍾進), Zhong Yao's younger brother.
 Cao Yong (曹永), Cao Ren's subordinate.

Chapter 61
 Zhou Shan (周善), a military officer sent by Sun Quan to fetch Sun Shangxiang back to Jiangdong. Sun Shangxiang brought along Liu Bei's young son Liu Shan and they boarded Zhou Shan's ship. Zhao Yun pursued them in an attempt to take back Liu Shan, and he fought with Zhou Shan and his men. Zhang Fei showed up to help Zhao Yun and he killed Zhou Shan.

Chapter 62
 Zi Xu (紫虚), the Super Human of the Dark Void. A hermit monk, gifted with second sight, who can tell the destiny of a man. Four generals of Liu Zhang go to see him to know their futures.

Chapter 64
 Yang Song (楊松), an adviser to Zhang Lu. He was described to be a greedy man who was easily tempted by riches and luxuries. He was once bribed by Liu Bei's forces to speak ill of Ma Chao in front of Zhang Lu, causing Zhang Lu to distrust Ma Chao and eventually forcing Ma Chao to defect to Liu Bei's side. In another incident, Yang Song accepted bribes from Cao Cao's forces to urge Zhang Lu to surrender during the Battle of Yangping. When Zhang Lu eventually surrendered to Cao Cao, Yang Song hoped to be rewarded but Cao Cao denounced him as a disloyal and untrustworthy person and had him executed.

Chapter 65
 Ma Han (馬漢), a military officer under Liu Zhang. He was killed by Zhao Yun.
 Liu Jun (劉晙), a military officer under Liu Zhang. He was killed by Zhao Yun.

Chapter 66
 Mu Shun (穆順), a palace eunuch involved in an assassination plot against Cao Cao. The plot was masterminded by Emperor Xian, who had the support of Empress Fu Shou and her father Fu Wan (伏完). Mu Shun helped by delivering letters, but he was caught and the plot was leaked out. Cao Cao had Mu Shun, the empress, her father, and their families all executed.

Chapter 67
 Chang Qi (昌奇), a subordinate of Zhang Lu's general Yang Ren.

Chapter 69
 Zhao Yan (趙顏), a man who had his fortune told by Guan Lu.

Chapter 70
 Xiahou De (夏侯德), Xiahou Yuan's nephew. He defended Mount Tiandang during the Battle of Mount Dingjun. Liu Bei's forces set fire to his camp and Xiahou De was killed by Yan Yan while he was busy putting out the flames.

Chapter 71
 Jiao Bing (焦炳), a military officer under Cao Cao. He was killed by Zhao Yun.
 Murong Lie (慕容烈), a subordinate of Wen Pin. He was killed by Zhao Yun.

Chapter 73
 Zhai Yuan (翟元), Cao Ren's subordinate. He was killed by Guan Ping at the Battle of Fancheng.
 Xiahou Cun (夏侯存), Cao Ren's subordinate. He was killed by Guan Yu at the Battle of Fancheng.

Chapter 74
 Lady Li (李氏), Pang De's wife.

Chapter 77
 Zuo Xian (左咸), an adviser to Sun Quan. He suggested to his lord to execute Guan Yu.

Chapter 78
 Prison Guard Wu (吳押獄), a prison guard who looked after Hua Tuo when the physician was imprisoned by Cao Cao. Before dying in prison, Hua Tuo passed the Qing Nang Shu, a medical book written by him, to Wu. Wu's wife later burnt the book to avoid trouble, but Wu returned and managed to salvage only a few pages.

Chapter 80
 Zu Bi (祖弼), the keeper of the Imperial Seal for Emperor Xian. He was executed by Cao Hong for refusing to hand over the seal during Emperor Xian's forced abdication.

Chapter 81
 Li Yi (李意), a mysterious old man who divined the future of Shu Han. Li Yiqi is his historical name.

Chapter 82
 Tan Xiong (譚雄), Sun Huan's subordinate. He was killed by Guan Xing at the Battle of Xiaoting.
 Cui Yu (崔禹), Zhu Ran's subordinate. He was killed by Zhang Bao at the Battle of Xiaoting.

Chapter 83
 Xia Xun (夏恂), Han Dang's subordinate. He was killed by Zhang Bao at the Battle of Xiaoting.
 Zhou Ping (周平), Zhou Tai's younger brother. He was killed by Guan Xing at the Battle of Xiaoting.
 Shi Ji (史迹), Pan Zhang's subordinate.  He was killed by Huang Zhong.

Chapter 84
 Chunyu Dan (淳于丹), Lu Xun's subordinate. Note: There was a Chunyu Shi (淳于式) in history, who was known for criticizing Lu Xun's harshness, but still retained Lu Xun's respect; there was also a general Xianyu Dan (鮮于丹) in history, who served Wu.

Chapter 87

 Guan Suo (關索), Guan Yu's third son.
 E Huan (鄂煥), Gao Ding's subordinate.
 Jinhuansanjie (金環三結), a subordinate of Meng Huo. He joined Dongtuna and Ahuinan in defending Nanman territory from invading Shu forces led by Zhuge Liang. The Shu army launched a surprise attack on his camp one night, and Jinhuan Sanjie was killed by Zhao Yun during the chaos.
 Dongtuna (董荼那), a subordinate of Meng Huo. He joined Ahuinan and Jinhuan Sanjie in defending Nanman territory from the Shu invasion. Jinhuan Sanjie was killed in action while Dongtuna and Ahuinan were captured. Zhuge Liang released Dongtuna and Ahuinan, who were grateful to him and decided to help him. They plotted against Meng Huo later and captured their lord and presented him to Zhuge Liang. Zhuge Liang released Meng Huo (for the second time) after the latter complained that he was betrayed and captured by his men and did not have a chance to fight a proper battle. Meng Huo then had Dongtuna and Ahuinan executed for their betrayal.
 Ahuinan (阿會喃), a subordinate of Meng Huo. He was executed by Meng Huo along with Dongtuna.
 Mangyachang (忙牙長), a subordinate of Meng Huo. He was defeated in battle by Wang Ping and was later killed by Ma Dai.

Chapter 88

 Meng You (孟優), Meng Huo's younger brother.

Chapter 89

 King Duosi (朵思大王), the lord of Tulong Cave (禿龍洞) and an ally of Meng Huo. He assisted Meng Huo in countering the Shu army. The poisonous springs and mist outside Tulong Cave posed a big problem to Zhuge Liang and deterred the Shu forces from advancing for quite some time.
 Meng Jie (孟節), Meng Huo's elder brother. Unlike Meng Huo and Meng You, he gave up his old primitive lifestyle and was assimilated into civil society. He helped Zhuge Liang by pointing out the methods to counter the poisonous springs and mist outside Tulong Cave.
 Yang Feng (楊鋒), a Nanman cave lord and an ally of Meng Huo. He surrendered to Zhuge Liang and helped the latter capture Meng Huo.

Chapter 90

 Lady Zhurong (祝融夫人), Meng Huo's wife.
 Cave Lord Dailai (帶來洞主), Lady Zhurong's younger brother. He suggested to Meng Huo to enlist the help of King Mulu and Wutugu to deal with the Shu invaders.
 King Mulu (木鹿大王), the lord of Bana Cave (八納洞) and an ally of Meng Huo. He possessed magical powers and could change the weather and control wild beasts and direct them into battle. He scored some initial victories against the Shu forces with the aid of his powers, but lost when his animals were scared away by Zhuge Liang's flame-spewing wooden beasts. While he was retreating, the elephant he was riding on threw him off its back and trampled him to death.
 Wutugu (兀突骨), the king of Wuge (烏戈) and an ally of Meng Huo. He was described to be gigantic in stature and he dined on venomous serpents. His soldiers wore armour made of dried and oiled rattan, which was light enough to float on water, yet sufficiently hard to prevent sharp blades from penetrating, so they were known as the "Rattan Armour Army" (藤甲兵). He scored initial successes against the Shu forces due to his army's impenetrable armour. However, Zhuge Liang figured out that the armour was flammable, so he ordered his men to lure Wutugu and his soldiers into a trap. Wutugu and his army were set on fire and they all died.
 Tu'an (土安), Wutugu's subordinate.
 Xi'ni (奚泥), Wutugu's subordinate.

Chapter 91
 Zhang Tao (張韜), a close acquaintance of Guo Nüwang.

Chapter 92
 Han De (韓德), a Wei general who followed Xiahou Mao to deal with the Shu invasion led by Zhuge Liang. He was killed by Zhao Yun, who also killed his four sons.
 Han Ying (韓瑛), Han De's son.
 Han Yao (韓瑤), Han De's son.
 Han Qiong (韓瓊), Han De's son.
 Han Qi (韓琪), Han De's son.
 Pan Sui (潘遂), Xiahou Mao's subordinate.
 Dong Xi (董禧), Xiahou Mao's subordinate.
 Xue Ze (薛則), Xiahou Mao's subordinate.
 Pei Xu (裴緒), a Shu officer ordered by Zhuge Liang to disguise himself as a Wei officer who broke out of the siege at Nan'an Commandery. Pei Xu then went to Anding and lied to Cui Liang, luring Cui to lead his army out of Anding Commandery to help Xiahou Mao at Nan'an Commandery. He was seen through by Jiang Wei (then still a Wei officer) when he tried to lure another Wei commander, Ma Zun, out of his city to help Xiahou Mao.
 Cui Liang (崔諒), the Administrator of Anding Commandery. He feigned surrender to Zhuge Liang after being surrounded, and attempted to lure the Shu forces into a trap at Nan'an Commandery. However, Zhuge Liang saw through his trick, and Cui Liang ended up being killed by Zhang Bao.
 Yang Ling (楊陵), the Administrator of Nan'an Commandery. He collaborated with Cui Liang to lure the Shu forces into a trap at Nan'an, but Zhuge Liang saw through their plan, and Yang Ling was killed by Guan Xing.

Chapter 94
 Cheliji (徹里吉), the king of the Qiang people in northwestern China.
 Yadan (雅丹), the chancellor of the Qiang kingdom.
 Yueji (越吉), a Qiang general.
 Han Zhen (韓禎), a Shu general defending Xiping (西平).

Chapter 95
 Su Yong (蘇顒), Guo Huai's subordinate.
 Wan Zheng (萬政), Guo Huai's subordinate.
 Chen Zao (陳造), a Wei general. Slain by Ma Dai.

Chapter 96
 Zhang Pu (張普), Cao Xiu's subordinate.

Chapter 97
 Xie Xiong (謝雄), a Shu military officer. He was killed by Wang Shuang.
 Gong Qi (龔起), a Shu military officer. He was killed by Wang Shuang.

Chapter 100
 Qin Liang (秦良), a Wei general, killed by Liao Hua.
 Gou An (苟安), a subordinate of the Shu general Li Yan. He was tasked with escorting supplies to the Shu army at the frontline during one of the Northern Expeditions. However, he was late by 10 days because he got drunk. Zhuge Liang wanted to have him executed but eventually spared him and had him flogged. Gou An defected to the Wei army later and was tasked by Sima Yi to spread rumours in the Shu capital Chengdu, causing the Shu emperor Liu Shan to distrust Zhuge Liang and order him to return to Chengdu, resulting in the failure of that Northern Expedition. When Zhuge Liang finally cleared the misunderstanding with Liu Shan, he asked where Gou An was, but Gou An had already fled to Wei. Note: There was a similarly named Gou An (句安) in the written histories, who served with Li Zhao (李韶) under Jiang Wei in 249. Gou An ran out of supplies and defected to Wei, later serving under Zhong Hui in the Conquest of Shu by Wei. This Gou An also appears in the novel as another personality.

Chapter 102
 Cen Wei (岑威), a Wei general, killed by Wang Ping.
 Zheng Wen (鄭文), a Wei general.
 Du Rui (杜睿), a Shu general.
 Hu Zhong (胡忠), a Shu general
 Qin Ming (秦明), Qin Lang's younger brother.

Chapter 103
 Zhang Qiu (張球), a subordinate of the Wei general Man Chong. He participated in the Battle of Hefei (234) against Eastern Wu, in which he launched a fire attack on Zhuge Jin's naval fleet and drove the latter back.

Chapter 106
 Pei Jing (裴景), a Wei general who participated in Sima Yi's Liaodong campaign.
 Qiu Lian (仇連) (sometimes called Chou Lian in translations), a Wei general who participated in Sima Yi's Liaodong campaign.

Chapter 107
 Pan Ju (潘舉), Cao Shuang's subordinate.

Chapter 109
 Wang Tao (王韜), Sima Zhao's registrar. He met Jiang Wei at the Battle of Mount Tielong, and suggested praying for a water spring when water ran scarce.

Chapter 110
 Ge Yong (葛雍), Guanqiu Jian's subordinate.
 Song Bai (宋白), the Prefect of Shen County.
 Zhu Fang (朱芳), a Wei general.
 Zhang Ming (張明), a Wei general.
 Hua Yong (花永), a Wei general.
 Liu Da (劉達), a Wei general.

Chapter 111
 Bao Su (鮑素), a Shu general.

Chapter 112
 Wang Zhen (王真), Sima Wang's subordinate.
 Li Peng (李鵬), Sima Wang's subordinate.
 Zeng Xuan (曾宣), Zhuge Dan's subordinate. He surrendered to Wei during Zhuge Dan's Rebellion.
 Chen Jun (陳俊), Sima Zhao's subordinate.

Chapter 113
 Zheng Lun (鄭倫), Deng Ai's subordinate. He was killed by Liao Hua.
 Deng Cheng (鄧程), a Wu official.
 Gan Xiu (干休), an old man who met the Wu emperor Sun Xiu in Qu'e County.
 Dang Jun (黨均), Deng Ai's adviser. He bribed the Shu eunuch Huang Hao to spread rumours that Jiang Wei would defect, causing Liu Shan to recall Jiang Wei from the battlefield.

Chapter 114
 Wang Guan (王瓘), Deng Ai's subordinate.

Chapter 116
 Lu Xun (盧遜), a Shu general defending Nanzheng.
 Ning Sui (甯隨), Jiang Wei' subordinate. He suggested to attack Yong Province via Konghan Valley to force the Wei general Zhuge Xu to retreat from Yinping, allowing Jiang Wei to enter Jiange.

Chapter 117
 Lady Li (李氏), Ma Miao's wife. She committed suicide when Jiangyou fell to Wei forces.
 Peng He (彭和), a Shu general.
 Qiu Ben (丘本), a Wei general. He tried to convince Zhuge Zhan to surrender at Mianzhu but Zhuge Zhan refused. He later organised a surprise attack on the pass, leading to Shu's defeat.

Chapter 118
 Lady Cui (崔氏), Liu Chen's wife. She committed suicide together with her husband after the fall of Shu.

Chapter 119
 Zhang Jie (張節), a Wei official who served as a Gentleman of the Yellow Gate (黃門侍郎).

Chapter 120
 Zhang Shang (張尚), a Jin general who killed the Wu general Lu Jing during the conquest of Wu by Jin.
 Chen Yuan (陳元), Yang Hu's subordinate.
 Sun Ji (孫冀), a Wu general who replaced Lu Kang as commander-in-chief of the Wu armies to resist the invading Jin forces.

Others
 Bao Sanniang (鮑三娘), a woman warrior and one of Guan Suo's wives.
 Huaman (花鬘), Meng Huo and Lady Zhurong's daughter. She was first introduced in a stage play in the setting of Zhuge Liang's Southern Campaign against the Nanman. When Zhuge Liang led Shu Han forces to attack the Nanman, Huaman joined in the resistance against the invaders. She was captured by the Shu Han general Guan Suo in battle, and started a romance with him. They were forced to separate because they stood on opposing sides, but their love was not affected by that. After the Nanman surrendered to Shu Han, Zhuge Liang arranged for Guan Suo and Huaman to be married.
 Ma Yunlu (馬雲騄), a character in the novel Fan Sanguo Yanyi (反三國演義). She was a woman warrior,  Ma Chao's younger sister and later married Zhao Yun.

See also
 Lists of people of the Three Kingdoms

References

Fictional People
Fictional
 
Three Kingdoms
Lists of literary characters